Gazzaniga (Bergamasque:  or ) is a comune (municipality) in the Province of Bergamo in the Italian region of Lombardy, located about  northeast of Milan and  northeast of Bergamo.

Gazzaniga borders the following municipalities: Albino, Aviatico, Cene, Cornalba, Costa di Serina, Fiorano al Serio, Vertova.

History
Traces of human presence in the Bronze Age have been found in Gazzaniga. The first document attesting the existence of a burgh (castle) dates from 476 AD, when the Barbarian king Odoacer ransacked it. In the Middle Ages Gazzaniga was part of the Confederazione de Honio together with neighbouring communes; in 1397 Gazzaniga was destroyed by the Ghibellines, and again by the Guelphs in the next year.

Later Gazzaniga was in the possession of the Republic of Venice. In 1629 Gazzaniga suffered from a plague.

Demographic evolution

References